The Dartmouth Ferry, sometimes called the Kingswear Ferry, may refer to one of three ferries that link Dartmouth and Kingswear, on opposite sides of the River Dart in the English county of Devon. From north to south, these ferries are:

Dartmouth Higher Ferry, a vehicular cable ferry which crosses the River Dart in the English county of Devon
Dartmouth Passenger Ferry, a passenger ferry which crosses the River Dart in the English county of Devon
Dartmouth Lower Ferry, a vehicular and passenger ferry which crosses the River Dart in the English county of Devon

There is also the Halifax–Dartmouth Ferry Service in Nova Scotia, Canada.